John Lenwood "Jackie" McLean (May 17, 1931 – March 31, 2006) was an American jazz alto saxophonist, composer, bandleader, and educator, and is one of the few musicians to be elected to the DownBeat Hall of Fame in the year of their death.

Biography
McLean was born in New York City. His father, John Sr., played guitar in Tiny Bradshaw's orchestra. After his father's death in 1939, Jackie's musical education was continued by his godfather, his record-store-owning stepfather, and several noted teachers. He also received informal tutoring from neighbors Thelonious Monk, Bud Powell, and Charlie Parker. During high school McLean played in a band with Kenny Drew, Sonny Rollins, and Andy Kirk, Jr. (the saxophonist son of Andy Kirk).

Along with Rollins, McLean played on Miles Davis' Dig album, when he was 20 years old.  As a young man he also recorded with Gene Ammons, Charles Mingus (for Pithecanthropus Erectus), George Wallington, and as a member of Art Blakey's Jazz Messengers. McLean joined Blakey after reportedly being punched by Mingus. Fearing for his life, McLean pulled out a knife and contemplated using it against Mingus in self-defense, but later stated that he was grateful that he had not stabbed the bassist.

McLean's early recordings as leader were in the hard bop school. He later became an exponent of modal jazz without abandoning his foundation in hard bop. Throughout his career he was known for a distinctive tone, akin to the tenor saxophone and often described with such adjectives as "bitter-sweet", "piercing", or "searing", a slightly sharp pitch, and a strong foundation in the blues.

McLean was a heroin addict throughout his early career, and the resulting loss of his New York City cabaret card forced him to undertake a large number of recording dates to earn income in the absence of nightclub performance opportunities. Consequently, he produced an extensive body of recorded work in the 1950s and 1960s. He was under contract with Blue Note Records from 1959 to 1967, having previously recorded for Prestige. Blue Note offered better pay and more artistic control than other labels, and his work for this organization is highly regarded and includes leadership and sideman dates with a wide range of musicians, including Donald Byrd, Sonny Clark, Lee Morgan, Ornette Coleman, Dexter Gordon, Freddie Redd, Billy Higgins, Freddie Hubbard, Grachan Moncur III, Bobby Hutcherson, Mal Waldron, Tina Brooks and many others.

In 1962, he recorded Let Freedom Ring for Blue Note. This album was the culmination of attempts he had made over the years to deal with harmonic problems in jazz, incorporating ideas from the free jazz developments of Ornette Coleman and the "new breed" which inspired his blending of hard bop with the "new thing": "the search is on, Let Freedom Ring". Let Freedom Ring began a period in which he performed with avant-garde jazz musicians rather than the veteran hard bop performers he had been playing with previously. His adaptation of modal jazz and free jazz innovations to his vision of hard bop made his recordings from 1962 on distinctive.

McLean recorded with dozens of musicians and had a gift for spotting talent. Saxophonist Tina Brooks, trumpeter Charles Tolliver, pianist Larry Willis, trumpeter Bill Hardman, and tubist Ray Draper were among those who benefited from McLean's support in the 1950s and 1960s. Drummers such as Tony Williams, Jack DeJohnette, Lenny White, Michael Carvin, and Carl Allen gained important early experience with McLean.

In 1967, his recording contract, like those of many other progressive musicians, was terminated by Blue Note's new management. His opportunities to record promised so little pay that he abandoned recording as a way to earn a living, concentrating instead on touring. In 1968, he began teaching at The Hartt School of the University of Hartford. He later set up the university's African American Music Department (now the Jackie McLean Institute of Jazz) and its Bachelor of Music degree in Jazz Studies program. His Steeplechase recording New York Calling, made with his son René McLean, showed that by 1980 the assimilation of all influences was complete.

In 1970, he and his wife, Dollie McLean, along with jazz bassist Paul (PB) Brown, founded the Artists Collective, Inc. of Hartford, an organization dedicated to preserving the art and culture of the African Diaspora. It provides educational programs and instruction in dance, theatre, music and visual arts. The membership of McLean's later bands were drawn from his students in Hartford, including Steve Davis and his son René, who is a jazz saxophonist and flautist as well as a jazz educator.  Also in McLean's Hartford group was Mark Berman, the jazz pianist and broadway conductor of Smokey Joe's Cafe and Rent. In 1979 he reached No. 53 in the UK Singles Chart with "Doctor Jackyll and Mister Funk".  This track, released on RCA as a 12" single, was an unusual sidestep for McLean to contribute towards the funk/disco revolution of the late 1970s.  Many people, at the time, in the clubs where it was played confused the female singers on the track with his name thinking he was actually female.

He received an American Jazz Masters fellowship from the National Endowment for the Arts in 2001 and numerous other national and international awards. McLean was the only American jazz musician to found a department of studies at a university and a community-based organization almost simultaneously. Each has existed for over three decades.

McLean died on March 31, 2006, in Hartford, Connecticut after a long illness. In 2006, Jackie McLean was elected to the DownBeat Hall of Fame via the International Critics Poll. He is interred in Woodlawn Cemetery, The Bronx, New York City.

A. B. Spellman's 1966 study, Black Music, Four Lives: Cecil Taylor, Ornette Coleman, Herbie Nichols, Jackie McLean, still in print, includes extensive mid-career reflections by McLean on his youth and career to date.  Derek Ansell's full-length biography of McLean, Sugar Free Saxophone. details the story of his career and provides a full analysis of his music on record.

Discography

As leader/co-leader

As sideman 
The sortable table's default is the date of the recording session. An asterisk (*) behind the album's title signifies only a minor contribution by McLean to the recording.

Filmography
The Connection, as himself (dir. Shirley Clarke)
Jackie McLean on Mars (1980), as himself (dir. Ken Levis) http://vimeo.com/12192828
Ken Burns' Jazz (2000), as himself (dir. Ken Burns)

References

Further reading
Derek Ansell, Sugar Free Saxophone: The Life and Music of Jackie McLean. London: Northway Publications, 2012. 
Guillaume Belhomme, Jackie McLean. Nantes: Lenka lente, 2014.

External links 
Jackie McLean at Allmusic

Jackie McLean  complete discography from Music City
Jackie McLean discography at JazzDisco.org
Jackie McLean at NEA Jazz Masters
Jackie McLean at Hard Bop
Jackie McLean audio interviews at New England Jazz History Database
Artists Collective Inc. – official history
Artists Collective Inc. – history
Jackie McLean obituary in The Guardian (London) by John Fordham, April 3, 2006
Jackie McLean obituary "Blues for Jackie" in Hartford Courant (Hartford, CT) by Owen McNally, April 1, 2006
Jackie McLean – Jazz Portraits from the WGBH Archives, a radio documentary from WGBH Radio Boston
Jackie McLean on Mars – film

1931 births
2006 deaths
American jazz composers
American male jazz composers
American jazz alto saxophonists
American male saxophonists
African-American saxophonists
Bebop saxophonists
Hard bop saxophonists
Modal jazz saxophonists
Post-bop saxophonists
Mainstream jazz saxophonists
The Jazz Messengers members
Miles Davis
Musicians from Hartford, Connecticut
Musicians from New York City
SteepleChase Records artists
Prestige Records artists
Inner City Records artists
Verve Records artists
Blue Note Records artists
University of Hartford Hartt School faculty
Jazz musicians from New York (state)
20th-century saxophonists
Burials at Woodlawn Cemetery (Bronx, New York)
20th-century jazz composers
20th-century American male musicians